Frozen 2 (Original Motion Picture Soundtrack) is the soundtrack album to the Disney's 2019 animated film of the same name. It was mainly composed by Kristen Anderson-Lopez and Robert Lopez, in addition to the end credits covers of three of the songs by Panic! at the Disco, Kacey Musgraves, and Weezer, respectively. The album was released on November 15, 2019, on digital, CD and vinyl formats, and it consisted of seven songs along with a remix of "Reindeer(s) Are Better Than People" from the original Frozen. The deluxe edition features a second disc of score tracks by composer Christophe Beck, cut songs, and instrumentals to the seven songs in the film.

In December 2019,  it reached number one on the US Billboard 200 December 2019, making it the first soundtrack of an animated film to hit the position since its predecessor. The single "Into the Unknown" was nominated for the Golden Globe Award for Best Original Song, the Academy Award for Best Original Song, and the Critics' Choice Movie Award for Best Song, losing to "(I'm Gonna) Love Me Again" from Rocketman.

Background
In March 2018, Kristen Anderson-Lopez revealed in an interview that she and her husband, Robert Lopez, would return from the film Frozen to write songs for its sequel Frozen II, having been already recorded a song for the project with the help of star Kristen Bell. Later in the D23 Expo presentation of that same year, Disney revealed that the soundtrack would incorporate a total of seven songs.

Marketing details on the complete tracklist were unveiled on September 30, 2019, which would be released on the following November 15 distributed by Walt Disney Records.

Co-director and screenwriter Jennifer Lee said that "the songs and score of Frozen 2 reflect both the growth of the characters and the deepening of their story", she described the songs as "emotional, personal yet powerful, intimate but also epic". Another co-director Chris Buck emphasized the importance of the musical team, the Lopezes, and Christophe Beck. Additionally, he noted the impact of the vibrant and emotional musics, and said it helps deepen and expand the reach of the story. The song "Into the Unknown", sung by Idina Menzel as Elsa with additional vocals by Norwegian recording artist Aurora, has been called the successor of Frozens "Let It Go".

Anderson-Lopez stated their achievements come from brainstorming on big questions — "what is the story that we all as artists, individually and collectively, need to tell? She also disclosed their production strategy of using sensitive emotional feelings and connections to the story. Lopez also said that "[his and Anderson-Lopez's] tradition of songwriting come from inspirations of the world of musical theater, where songs must always forward the story freshly and surprisingly. Every song has to take a character on a journey".

Lopez further explained that the songs are thematically connected to the idea of change, and the idea of the journey.  According to Anderson-Lopez, the theme of a journey was a very "meta-story" for them, because it was not always clear along the way how all the songs would fit together in the final version of the film. They kept telling themselves that things would be eventually clearer in six months, and by the time the movie proceeds. According to Anderson-Lopez, the theme of a journey was a very "meta-story" for them, because it was not always clear along the way how all the songs would fit together in the final version of the film.

In November 2019, Panic! at the Disco's version of "Into the Unknown" was released as a single. Later in that same month, the Korean versions of "Into the Unknown" were also released, which would be performed by K-pop star and Girls' Generation member Taeyeon.

Composer Christophe Beck, who previously scored the first film, returned for the sequel, his score draws elements from Lopez and Anderson-Lopez's songs. As with the first film, Beck used Norwegian elements for the sequel's score, as well as featuring the Norwegian female choir Cantus, with Beck stating that it gives the score a "magical" setting, yet still being "rooted in real tradition". Beck said that the film's score reflects the character's growth since the original film, stating that "[s]imilar to how Elsa and Anna have grown up since the last film, the new score has also matured and introduces more sophisticated musical concepts and thematic elements". Beck also said that he wanted the sequel's score to reflect the film's "complex and intense" emotional story while commenting that he enjoyed "exploring extreme dynamic contrasts, harmonic complexity, intricate textures with vibrant colors, and hugely expressive melodic moments".

Track listing
All songs are written by Robert Lopez and Kristen Anderson-Lopez with scores composed by Christophe Beck.

Charts

Weekly charts

Year-end charts

Certifications

See also
 List of Billboard 200 number-one albums of 2019

References

External links 

2019 soundtrack albums
Disney animation soundtracks
Walt Disney Records soundtracks
Fantasy film soundtracks
Musical film soundtracks
Frozen (franchise) mass media